, better known by his stage name , is a Japanese singer-songwriter and composer. He was born in Mie Prefecture in Japan and later grew up in Chiba Prefecture.
For two years from 2001, he used his given name Naoto as his stage name. In 2001, while he was still attending Chuo University , Naoto debuted into the major music scene with his single "Growing up!!" released by Sony Music Records. Then he kept releasing the total three singles and one album before graduating from his university in 2002.

After the graduation, he went on to "the trip around the world through 28 countries", which took 515 days over two years from 2003 to 2004. Upon his return home, he began his professional music career with his new stage name, Naoto Inti Raymi meaning "the festival of the sun" in Quechuan language. Inti means the sun, while Raymi means festival.

In 2001, From Universal Sigma , he released "Carnival?", the first single with a major label as Naoto Inti Raymi. The following hit singles "TAKARAMONO – KONO KOEGA NAKUNARUMADE – “ in 2010 and “IMANO KIMIWO WASURENAI" in 2011 both were downloaded more than one million times at multiple music download sites.

In 2012, he was invited to perform at the most prestigious music TV show in Japan, KOUHAKU UTA GASSEN. After that, he continued releasing singles and albums while he toured around the nation for concerts. In 2015, his one-man show at KYOCERA DOME OSAKA successfully drew 40,000 audience to celebrate his 5th anniversary year of his career with a major record label.

Not only as a singer-songwriter, his wide range of musical talents is also allowing himself to actively write songs for the other artists. Besides in the music industry, he began his career in acting as well when he appeared in the 2015 movie "KAMISAMA WA BALINI IRU". Then he played the lead role of the musical "DNA-SHARAKU" in 2016 and appeared in the TV drama series "KOUNODORI" in 2017.

His perspective on music and life itself evolves from his "journey", which he still continues. So far, he has visited as many as 65 countries. This "journey" has given him inspiration and is expected to provide him with opportunities to succeed worldwide such as in Asia, North and South Americas and Europe.

Currently he is working on making music in other languages than his mother tongue of Japanese to make his dream come true, which is going on to a world tour.

"Inti Raymi" is Quechuan (Incan language) for "festival of the sun."

Life and career

1979–2000 
In 1993 when he was 14 years old in junior high school, Naoto started learning how to play the guitar and writing songs. In 1995, he moved on to high school and started making songs more seriously and self-produced his own album with the songs he had made. He also began playing his songs on the streets to improve his performing skills. Those street performances helped him create his signature style of getting his audience more actively involved in the live experience. In 1999, while he was a student at Chuo University, he had his first international trip in his life to New York City. Although he was just a tourist sightseeing, he was somehow called up onto the stage at Apollo Theater in Harlem. Not scared at all even by the totally unexpected opportunity, he grabbed the microphone and successfully entertained the audience, improvising with the band there. The standing ovation he received there and the experience of exciting people with his music even with the language barrier instilled a new dream in him, which is to be a world-class performer.

2001–2004 "Naoto" Period 
In 2001, he signed a record deal with Sony Music Records and made a debut onto the scene. In June 2002, he released the album "Funk Renaissance", however it did not enjoy any hit singles out of it. After releasing another single in September that year, he had to stop making new songs and the record deal was terminated. Disappointed, he took time off to regroup himself. Remembering his dream of going on to a world tour, which the Apollo Theater experience brought to him, he decided to travel around the world to grow as a person and experience the different styles of music worldwide. In August 2003, his journey began. Before he came back to Japan in December that year, he had visited 28 countries, realizing the world can offer much more than what he had seen on TV. In particular, the Middle Eastern countries and the warmth of the people there gave him a totally new perspective on his career goal, which is to make the world a more peaceful place with his music. He was given an opportunity to perform in front of the late Yasser Arafat, who was then the Chairman of the Palestine Liberation Organization, and he sang "UE O MUITE ARUKOU", one of the most popular Japanese pop songs in the world. The other notable events during the journey included a tour with a local band in Miami, Florida, United States and almost signing a professional football player contract with a football club in Peru. He surely displayed his wide range of potential as a person and an artist at the places he visited, and he expanded his horizon at the same time.

2005–2009 
After coming back from his journey around the world, he came up with his new stage name of Naoto Inti Raymi to restart his music career in Japan, with inspiration by his memorable travel experience at Salar de Uyuni in Bolivia. In Quechuan language, one of the indigenous languages of the Inca Empire, "Inti" means the sun and "Raymi" means festival.
While establishing his foundation as a musician by countless performances on the streets and in live houses, he had a life-changing opportunity to meet Kazutoshi Sakurai, the vocalist of Mr. Children, one of the most popular rock band in Japan. Naoto started joining Mr. Children’s concerts as a back chorus in 2008, and while doing that, he signed a contract with OORONG-SHA as a solo artist. Along with his commitment with Mr. Children, he kept performing solo at his own concerts and polishing his character and music.

2010– 
He made the third debut in his career with "Carnival?" in April 2010. Only eight months after that, he put on a successful solo concert at Nippon Budoukan, the mecca concert hall where all young Japanese artists dream of performing. The record releases were on a high pace in that year; the single "TAKARAMONO -KONO KOE GA NAKUNARUMADE-" one month after the debut in April, the first album "Shall we travel??" in July, and another single "ARITTAKE NO Love Song" in September. He also kept on visiting cities to perform, gradually at larger and larger venues and attracting bigger audiences and attention from the public accordingly. And his efforts came into fruition at the end of year 2012 as the appearance at Japan's annual New Year's Eve television music show "NHK KOUHAKU UTAGASSEN".
After many more songs released and growth as a singer-songwriter, Naoto performed at KYOSERA Dome (Osaka) in 2015 in front of 40,000 fans. Then he went on to take his talents to other artistic fields such as acting, taking the lead role at the musical "DNA-SHARAKU" in 2016. In 2017, he again traveled around the world to visit 19 countries and enrich his musical variety even further. The highlights of the following year were tours to all the 47 prefectures in Japan all by himself, producing a song for Masashi Sada, a legendary figure in Japanese pop music, writing a song to BOYS AND MEN who are a rising-star pop group performing mainly in Japan's region. His seventh album, his latest, titled as "7" was released on December 5, 2018, featuring a song he co-wrote with Mr. Children’s Kazutoshi Sakurai.

His stage is now not limited to inside Japan. To make his dream come true, going to a world tour, he has worked with non-Japanese song writers and made songs in other languages as well.

Discography

Albums

Extended plays

Singles

Other charted songs

Other appearances

Bibliography 
 , 2006,

References

External links 
 Official site 
 Official blog 

Living people
Japanese male musicians
Japanese male singer-songwriters
Japanese singer-songwriters
Japanese-language singers
1979 births
Universal Music Japan artists
People from Chiba Prefecture
People from Mie Prefecture
Musicians from Chiba Prefecture
Musicians from Mie Prefecture
21st-century Japanese singers
21st-century Japanese male singers